

Max-Eckart Wolff (19 December 1902 – 9 November 1988) was a naval commander in the Kriegsmarine of Nazi Germany during World War II. He was a recipient of the Knight's Cross of the Iron Cross.

Wolff as commander of destroyer Z2 Georg Thiele was credited with the sinking of the British destroyers HMS Hardy and HMS Hunter on 10 April 1940. On 13 April 1940 he torpedoed and damaged HMS Eskimo.  He later served as the Führer der Zerstörer (Commander of Destroyers) from 1943 to 1944.

In 1956, Wolff became the first commander of the independent post-war West German Bundesmarine.

Awards
 Iron Cross (1939)  2nd Class (6 November 1939) & 1st Class (12 May 1940)
 Wound Badge in Black (13 May 1940)
 Knight's Cross of the Iron Cross on 4 August 1940 as Korvettenkapitän and commander of destroyer Z2 Georg Thiele
 Destroyer War Badge (9 October 1940)
 Narvik Shield (10 November 1940)
 Great Cross of the Order of Merit of the Federal Republic of Germany (March 1963)

References

Citations

Bibliography

 
 

1902 births
1988 deaths
Bundesmarine admirals
Reichsmarine personnel
Kriegsmarine personnel
Recipients of the Knight's Cross of the Iron Cross
Commanders Crosses of the Order of Merit of the Federal Republic of Germany
Flotilla admirals of the German Navy
People from Wernigerode
Military personnel from Saxony-Anhalt